TSS Normannia was a passenger vessel built for the London and South Western Railway in 1911.

History

The ship was built by the Fairfield Govan and launched on 9 November 1911. With her sister ship  they were put on the service between Southampton and Le Havre. They were the first cross-channel steamers to be fitted with single-reduction geared Parsons turbines, which gave the vessels a speed of over 20 knots but also cut down on the vibration experienced by cross-Channel passengers.

She was requisitioned by the Admiralty in 1914 and operated as a troopship during the First World War, she also brought home Elsie Cameron Corbett and others freed from captivity.

She was acquired by the Southern Railway in 1923.

She was beached and abandoned.

References

1911 ships
Steamships of the United Kingdom
Ships built on the River Clyde
Ships of the Southern Railway (UK)
Ships of the London and South Western Railway
Maritime incidents in May 1940
Shipwrecks of France
Ships sunk by German aircraft